Memorial Drive is a long road that travels from Stone Mountain to Downtown Atlanta in the U.S. state of Georgia. In 2000, a part of Memorial Drive was named "Cynthia McKinney Parkway," but the naming has come under scrutiny since her primary defeat in 2006.

Memorial Drive began as East Fair Street, one of the first streets in Atlanta. It was named for the 19th century fairgrounds in Grant Park, which appeared on maps as early as the 1860s. East Fair Street led from the downtown commercial area to residential neighborhoods. Suburban growth in Atlanta and DeKalb County in the late 1890s led to the creation and expansion of neighborhoods such as Grant Park and Edgewood. This push for development further east extended East Fair Street to the edge of Atlanta City limits at Candler Road, allowing inclusion of the neighborhoods now known as East Lake and Kirkwood. On October 16, 1927, crews broke ground on the "Stone Mountain Memorial Drive." The groundbreaking was quite the affair, led by the Stone Mountain Memorial Association. This portion of the route was the extension from Avondale Estates to Stone Mountain. An announcement came in February 1930, that East Fair Street would officially be renamed to Memorial Drive. This drew the memorial line from Georgia’s state capitol to the "eternal temple to the Confederacy."

The Tupac Shakur memorial statue is located on this road.

Major intersections

See also
 
 Transportation in Atlanta

References

Roads in Atlanta
Cynthia McKinney